Heliodorus of Larissa (fl. 3rd century?) was a Greek mathematician, and the author of a short treatise on optics which is still extant.

Biography
Nothing is known about the life of Heliodorus. He was a native of Larissa, and he must have lived after the time of Claudius Ptolemy, whom he quotes. His short treatise on optics is little more than a commentary on Euclid. It was edited by one Damianus, who was either his son or his pupil. The first printed edition, in Greek and Latin, was published in Paris in 1657 with illustrative notes by Erasmus Bartholinus.

Works

See also
 Domninus of Larissa

Notes

3rd-century Greek people
Ancient Greek mathematicians
Ancient Larissaeans
3rd-century mathematicians